Xibeiqiao is a station on Line 5 and Line 6 of the Chengdu Metro in China. It was opened on 27 December 2019. Opposite direction cross-platform interchange is provided between the two lines at this station.

Station layout

References

Railway stations in Sichuan
Railway stations in China opened in 2019
Chengdu Metro stations